Texeira is a variant spelling of a common Portuguese surname Teixeira. Notable people with the surname include:

Mark Texeira, American comic book artist
Manuel Texeira, priest
Kanekoa Texeira, American baseball pitcher
David Texeira, Uruguayan footballer
Glover Texeira, Former UFC Light Heavyweight Champion
See also Teixeira and Teixeira (disambiguation)

Portuguese-language surnames